Claude Azéma (5 July 1943 – 6 September 2021) was a French Roman Catholic prelate. He was auxiliary bishop of Montpellier from 2003 to 2018. He was born in Vailhauquès.

References

1943 births
2021 deaths
People from Hérault
21st-century Roman Catholic bishops in France
Institut Catholique de Paris alumni
Place of death missing